The Vickers Type 143 or Bolivian Scout was a British single-seat fighter biplane designed and built by Vickers in 1929-1930. Six were built for Bolivia in 1930, which used the survivors in the Chaco War against Paraguay.

Design and development
Early in 1929, Bolivia, which was engaged in border disputes with Paraguay over the Gran Chaco region, and was trying to build up its air force, placed an order with Vickers for six fighter aircraft, the Vickers Type 143. The Type 143, or Bolivian Scout, was a development of the earlier Vickers Type 141 fighter, with the Type 141's Rolls-Royce Kestrel engine replaced by a Bristol Jupiter VIA, already powering other aircraft used by the Bolivian Air Force, and a stronger undercarriage to cope with the rough airfield surfaces in Bolivia. It was an all-metal, single-seat, biplane aircraft, with single-bay wings.

The Type 143 first flew on 11 June 1929, and successfully met all performance criteria. One of the six aircraft was evaluated by the Aeroplane and Armament Experimental Establishment (A & AEE) at Martlesham Heath before delivery to Bolivia.

A seventh aircraft, the Vickers Type 177  was built as a private venture to meet the requirements of Air Ministry Specification N.21/26 for a naval fighter, being fitted with a Jupiter XF engine and steerable wheel braking to aid on-deck manoeuvering. The Type 177 first flew on 26 November 1929, and while it was shown to have a maximum speed of 190 mph (310 km/h),  the Hawker Nimrod, not designed against this specification, was chosen instead to meet the Fleet Air Arm's requirement for a fighter.

Operational history
Delivery of the six Type 143s to Bolivia began in January 1930. While the type proved popular in Bolivian service, three of the six had been written off by the time the border disputes between Bolivia and Paraguay escalated into the Chaco War. The three remaining Type 143s continued to serve in the Chaco War until superseded by Curtiss Hawks, damaging at least one Paraguayan Wibault 73 in air-to-air combat.

Variants
Vickers Type 143 Six aircraft for Bolivia, powered by 450 hp (340 kW) Bristol Jupiter VIA engine.
Vickers Type 177 One prototype Naval Fighter, evaluated for Fleet Air Arm, powered by 540 hp (400 kW) Bristol Jupiter XFS engine. No production.

Operators

Bolivian Air Force received six aircraft.

Fleet Air Arm tested one prototype.

Specifications (Type 143)

See also
Aerial operations in the Chaco War

References

Notes

Bibliography

 Andrews, E.N. and E.B. Morgan. Vickers Aircraft Since 1908, Second edition. London: Putnam, 1988. .
 Green, W. and Gordon Swanborough. The Complete Book of Fighters. New York: Smithmark, 1994. .
 Mason, Francis K. The British Fighter since 1912. Annapolis, Maryland: Naval Institute Press, 1992. .

External links

 The Gran Chaco War: Fighting for Mirages in the Foothills of the Andes

1920s British fighter aircraft
Type 143
Transport in Bolivia
Aircraft first flown in 1929
Biplanes